Lothair II (835 – 8 August 869) was the king of Lotharingia from 855 until his death. He was the second son of Emperor Lothair I and Ermengarde of Tours. He was married to Teutberga (died 875), daughter of Boso the Elder.

Reign
For political reasons, his father made him marry Teutberga in 855. Just a few days before his death in late autumn of 855, Emperor Lothair I divided his realm of Middle Francia among his three sons, a partition known as Treaty of Prüm. Lothair II received the Middle Francia territory west of the Rhine stretching from the North Sea to the Jura Mountains. It became known as Regnum Lotharii and early in the 10th century as Lotharingia or Lorraine (a designation subsequently applied only to the Duchy of Lorraine). His elder brother Louis II received northern Italy and the title of Emperor, and his younger brother Charles received the western parts of his father's domains, Burgundy and the Provence.

On the death of his brother Charles in 863, Lothair added some lands south of the Jura to this realm, but except for a few feeble expeditions against the Norman pirates he seems to have done little for its government or its defense. Thirty-six of Lothair II's royal charters survive.

Teutberga was not capable of bearing children and Lothair's reign was chiefly occupied by his efforts to obtain an annulment of their marriage, and his relations with his uncles Charles the Bald and Louis the German were influenced by his desire to obtain their support for this endeavour. Although quarrels and reconciliations between the three kings followed each other in quick succession, in general it may be said that Louis favoured annulment, and Charles opposed it, while neither lost sight of the fact that Lothair had no sons to inherit his lands. Lothair, whose desire for annulment was prompted by his affection for his mistress, Waldrada, put away Teutberga, but Hucbert took up arms on her behalf, and after she had submitted successfully to the ordeal of water, Lothair was compelled to restore her in 858. Still pursuing his purpose, he won the support of his brother, Emperor Louis II, by a cession of lands and obtained the consent of the local clergy, such as Adventius of Metz, to the annulment and to his marriage with Waldrada, which took place in 862.

A synod of Frankish bishops met at Metz in 863 and confirmed this decision, but Teutberga fled to the court of Charles the Bald, and Pope Nicholas I voided the decision of the synod. An attack on Rome by the emperor was without result, and in 865 Lothair, threatened with excommunication and convinced that Louis and Charles at their recent meeting had discussed the partition of his kingdom, again took back his wife. Teutberga, however, either from inclination or compulsion, now expressed her desire for an annulment, and Lothair went to Italy to obtain the assent of the new pope, Adrian II.

Succession
His son, Hugh, by Waldrada, was declared illegitimate, so his heir was his brother, Louis II of Italy. As Louis was at that time campaigning against the Emirate of Bari, his kingdom was divided by and between his uncles Charles the Bald and Louis the German by the Treaty of Meerssen.

Descendants
Lothair II had some sons and probably three daughters, all by Waldrada, and all of whom were declared illegitimate:

 Hugh ( 855 – 895), Duke of Alsace (867–885)
 Gisela (c. 865 – 908), who in 883 married Godfrey, the Viking leader ruling in Frisia, who was murdered in 885
 Bertha (c. 863 – 925), who married Count Theobald of Arles (c. 854 – 895), nephew of Teutberga. They had two sons Hugh of Italy and Boso of Tuscany. After Theobald's death, between 895 and 898 she married Adalbert II of Tuscany (c. 875 – 915). They had at least three children: Guy, who succeeded his father as count and duke of Lucca and margrave of Tuscany; Lambert, who succeeded his brother in 929 but lost the titles in 931 to his half-brother Boso of Tuscany, and Ermengard.
 Ermengarde (d. 90?)
 Odo (d. c. 879)

References

Bibliography

 Hincmar, "Opusculum de divortio Lotharii regis et Tetbergae reginae," in Cursus completus patrologiae, tome cxxv., edited by J. P. Migne (Paris, 1857–79)
 M. Sdralek, Hinkmars von Rheims Kanonistisches Gutachten uber die Ehescheidung des Königs Lothar II (Freiburg, 1881)
 E. Dummler, Geschichte des ostfränkischen Reiches (Leipzig, 1887–88)
 E. Muhlbacher, Die Regenten des Kaiserreichs unter den Karolingern (Innsbruck, 1881)

Kings of Lotharingia
Frankish warriors
835 births
869 deaths
9th-century Frankish monarchs
Sons of emperors
9th-century Lotharingian people